This is a list of Daytona 500 winners.  The Daytona 500 is a  NASCAR Cup Series motor race held annually at the Daytona International Speedway in Daytona Beach, Florida. It is one of four restrictor plate races on the Cup schedule. The first Daytona 500 was held in 1959, coinciding with the opening of the speedway, and since 1982, it has been the season-opening race of the Cup series.

The Daytona 500 is regarded as the most important and prestigious race on the NASCAR calendar, carrying by far the largest purse.  Championship points awarded are equal to that of any other NASCAR Cup race. It is also the series' first race of the year; this phenomenon is virtually unique in sports, which tend to have championships or other major events at the end of the season rather than the start. Since 1995, U.S. television ratings for the Daytona 500 have been the highest for any auto race of the year, surpassing the traditional leader, the Indianapolis 500 which in turn greatly surpasses the Daytona 500 in in-track attendance and international viewing. The 2006 Daytona 500 attracted the sixth largest average live global TV audience of any sporting event that year with 20 million viewers.

The event serves as the final event of Speedweeks and is sometimes referred to as "The Great American Race" or the "Super Bowl of Stock Car Racing".  All 62 Daytona 500s since the first race in 1959 have been held in February. From 1971–2011, it was associated with Presidents Day weekend, taking place on the Sunday before the third Monday in February. For 2012, the race was pushed back a week, to the last Sunday of February.  Because of inclement weather conditions on February 26, the day the 2012 Daytona 500 was supposed to be held, the race was postponed until the evening of Monday, February 27, and it was not until the 2013 Daytona 500, which was held on February 24 of that year, that the race took place on the last Sunday of February for the first time.

The winner of the Daytona 500 is presented with the Harley J. Earl Trophy in Victory Lane, and the winning car is displayed, in race-winning condition, for one year at Daytona 500 Experience, a museum and gallery adjacent to Daytona International Speedway. Ricky Stenhouse Jr. is the race's incumbent champion after winning it in 2023.

List of winners

†– Andretti was born in a part of Italy that is now in Croatia, but became a naturalized American citizen. He remains the only foreign-born driver to win the race. ‡– Record for fastest Daytona 500 at  set by Buddy Baker in 1980. 1– Originally started 39th, but had to go back to the 43rd position due to changing to a backup car after crashing in the qualifying races.  A driver who crashes during the qualifying race and goes to a backup car, or after 2003, changes an engine between the first practice after the qualifying race and the Daytona 500, is relegated to the rear of the field. 2– Originally started 21st, but had to go back to the 39th position due to failing multiple inspections.

The following races were shortened:

  1965:  332.5 miles (133 laps) because of rain.
  1966:  495 miles (198 laps) because of rain.
  1974:  450 miles (180 laps) Race scheduled for 90% distance in response to the 1973 oil crisis; scoring began on lap 21.
  2003:  272.5 miles (109 laps) because of rain.
  2009: 380 miles (152 laps) because of rain.

The following races were lengthened because of the green–white–checker finish.  Note that from 2004 through 2009, only one attempt was permitted in NASCAR Cup Series racing.  From 2010 to 2016, a maximum of three attempts were permitted. Since 2017, an unlimited number of attempts are permitted

  2005: 507.5 miles (203 laps)
  2006: 507.5 miles (203 laps) 
  2007: 505 miles (202 laps) 
  2010: 520 miles (208 laps) (two attempts — Lap 203 & Lap 207; This was the first time a NASCAR Cup Series race used the green-white-checker format 2 times to finish a race)
  2011: 520 miles (208 laps) two attempts  — Lap 203 & Lap 207
  2012: 505 miles (202 laps) one attempt
  2015: 507.5 miles (203 laps) one attempt
  2018: 517.5 miles (207 laps) one attempt
  2019: 517.5 miles (207 laps) one attempt
  2020: 522.5 miles (209 laps) two attempts  — Lap 204 & Lap 208
  2022: 502.5 miles (201 laps) one attempt
  2023: 530 miles (212 laps) three attempts

Two races have been rescheduled from their original dates:
  2012: Rescheduled from February 26 to February 27 at noon and later rescheduled to start at 7 p.m. because of rain. (This marks the first time the Daytona 500 was moved to Monday, and the first night-time Daytona 500 race.)
  2020: Rescheduled from February 16 to February 17 at 4 p.m. because of rain.

The 2017 Daytona 500 was first time the "stage format" was used in the Daytona 500; it was set up in three stages similar to the all star race (but without the requirement to pit), where drivers are given an chance to pit if they wish to do so. Kyle Busch won the first stage earning him ten points in the new points format, Kevin Harvick won the second stage and Kurt Busch won the final stage in a dramatic last lap pass (passing Kyle Larson who ran out of gas) to win the race.

Multiple winners (drivers)

Multiple winners (teams)

Manufacturer wins

References

Florida sports-related lists
Lists of NASCAR drivers
NASCAR races at Daytona International Speedway